Slatina is a settlement in the Municipality of Šmartno ob Paki in northern Slovenia. It lies on the right bank of the Paka River, opposite Šmartno. The area is part of the traditional region of Styria. The municipality is now included in the Savinja Statistical Region.

A small chapel-shrine in the settlement is dedicated to the Sacred Heart and dates to 1890.

References

External links
Slatina at Geopedia

Populated places in the Municipality of Šmartno ob Paki